Kasteel is the Dutch language word for a castle or château.

It can also refer to:
 Sparta Stadion Het Kasteel, a football stadium
 Joop Kasteel (born 1964), a Dutch mixed martial artist
 Piet Kasteel (1901–2003), a Dutch journalist, diplomat, and colonial administrator